This is a list of seasons completed by the Southeastern Louisiana Lions football team of the National Collegiate Athletic Association (NCAA) Division I Football Championship Subdivision (FCS). Southeastern Louisiana's first football team was fielded in 1930.

Southeastern Louisiana originally competed as a football independent, before going on to compete in the Louisiana Intercollegiate Conference, Gulf States Conference, Gulf South Conference, and Gulf Star Conference. Following the 1985 season, Southeastern Louisiana's football team was discontinued for seventeen seasons, before being reinstated as a Division I-AA team in 2003. Southeastern Louisiana competed as a Division I-AA Independent team for two seasons before joining the I-AA's Southland Conference in 2005, of which it has been a member since.

Seasons
Statistics correct as of the end of the 2018-19 college football season

References

Southeastern Louisiana

Southeastern Louisiana Lions football seasons